Sir John Curzon, 1st Baronet (13 November 1598 – 13 December 1686) of Kedleston Hall in Derbyshire was an English politician and landowner who served as an Member of Parliament from 1628 to 1629, then 1640 to 1648. A devout Presbyterian, he supported the Parliamentarian cause during the First English Civil War, but was excluded by Pride's Purge in 1648.

Personal details

John Curzon was born 13 November 1598, eldest son of John Curzon (1552–1632) of Kedleston Hall, who was High Sheriff of Derbyshire in 1609, and Millicent Sacheveral (1571–1618), daughter of Sir Ralph Sacheverel of Staunton, and widow of Thomas Gell (1552–1594) of Hopton, Derbyshire.

In 1623 he married Patience Crewe (1600–1642), daughter of Sir Thomas Crewe of Stene, Northamptonshire; they had four sons and three daughters. He was succeeded by his eldest surviving son Nathaniel (1636–1719).

Career
Curzon graduated from Magdalen College, Oxford in 1618, aged 18, then attended the Inner Temple in 1620. In 1628 he was elected Member of Parliament for Brackley and sat until 1629 when King Charles decided to rule without parliament for eleven years. He inherited the Kedleston estate on his father's death in 1632.

Curzon was created a Baronet, of Kedleston in the County of Derby, in both the Baronetage of Nova Scotia on 18 June 1636 and the Baronetage of England on 11 August 1641. He served as High Sheriff of Derbyshire in 1637. In April 1640, he was elected as MP for Derbyshire in the Short Parliament and in November 1640 re-elected MP for Derbyshire for the Long Parliament,
sitting until he was excluded under Pride's Purge in 1648.

Curzon died in 1686 and was buried at All Saints Church, Kedleston.

References

Sources
 
 findagrave.com burial record

1598 births
1686 deaths
John
People from Kedleston
Roundheads
Baronets in the Baronetage of Nova Scotia
Baronets in the Baronetage of England
Members of the Parliament of England (pre-1707) for constituencies in Derbyshire
English MPs 1628–1629
English MPs 1640 (April)
English MPs 1640–1648
High Sheriffs of Derbyshire
Alumni of Magdalen College, Oxford
Members of the Inner Temple